Ingensia is a genus of sea snails, marine gastropod mollusks in the family Muricidae, the murex snails or rock snails.

Species
Species within the genus Ingensia include:
 Ingensia brithys Houart, 2001
 Ingensia ingens (Houart, 1987)
Species brought into synonymy
 Ingensia anomalus (Dell, 1956): synonym of Terefundus anomalus Dell, 1956
 Ingensia axirugosus (Dell, 1956): synonym of Terefundus axirugosus Dell, 1956

References

 Houart, R. (2001). Ingensia gen. nov. and eleven new species of Muricidae (Gastropoda) from New Caledonia, Vanuatu, and Wallis and Futuna Islands. in: P. Bouchet & B.A. Marshall (eds) Tropical Deep-Sea Benthos, volume 22. Mémoires du Muséum National d'Histoire Naturelle, ser. A, Zoologie. 185: 243-269.

Aspellinae
Gastropod genera